Choristoneura zapulata, the zapulata moth, is a moth of the family Tortricidae. The species was first described by Robinson in 1869. It is found in North America, where it has been recorded from British Columbia to Quebec, south to California, Illinois and Pennsylvania.

The wingspan is 20–27 mm. The forewings are straw yellow to light brown with darker brown reticulations. The hindwings are straw yellow with a light grey inner half. Adults have been recorded on wing from May to September.

The larvae feed on Alnus, Symphoricarpos, Vaccinium, Trifolium, Ceanothus, Fragaria and Rosa species, as well as Betula papyrifera, Comptonia peregrina
Prunus virginiana, Populus tremuloides and Arctostaphylos manzanita.

References

Moths described in 1869
Choristoneura